Egen ingång (Separate Entrance) is a 1956 Swedish drama film directed by Hasse Ekman. The film is based on Sigurd Hoel's novel En dag i oktober (One Day in October).

Plot
It is a seemingly ordinary day in October. Since she separated from her husband six months ago, Marianne Stenman has lived in a room with a separate entrance on Kavallerigatan 27 in Stockholm. But to Marianne this is not an ordinary day, when we first meet her she has only six hours to live. The film lays the puzzle of Marianne's last hours, piece by piece.

Cast
Maj-Britt Nilsson as Marianne Stenman
Alf Kjellin as Arvid Stenman
Hasse Ekman as Sture Falk
Gertrud Fridh as Margit Friberg
Sigge Fürst as Hjalmar Friberg
Bibi Andersson as Karin Johansson
Lars Ekborg as Ekelöf 
Gunvor Pontén as Mrs. Falk
Elsa Carlsson as Mrs. Petreus 
Holger Löwenadler as Consul Oskar Petreus
Hjördis Petterson as Mrs. Gabrielsson
Marianne Löfgren as Mrs. Johansson
Hugo Björne as Hans Gabrielsson
Elsa Ebbesen as Mariannes aunt
Sven-Eric Gamble as photographer 
Sif Ruud as Wardrobe attendant
Siv Ericks as Wardrobe attendant
Ludde Juberg as Theatre doorman 
Tord Stål as Professor Anderberg

References

External links

1956 films
Films directed by Hasse Ekman
Swedish drama films
1950s Swedish-language films
1950s Swedish films
1956 drama films
Swedish black-and-white films